Eugenia Chialvo (born 21 February 1983) is an Argentine former professional tennis player.

Biography
Chialvo grew up in the city of San Francisco in Córdoba. She was a member of the Argentine side which won the 1999 Junior Fed Cup in Perth, along with
Gisela Dulko and María Emilia Salerni.

A left-handed player, Chialvo reached a best singles ranking of 279 in the world and won two ITF titles. As a doubles player she won a further six titles, with a top ranking of 162. She featured in the doubles main draw of WTA Tour tournaments in Madrid and Palermo in 2001, both partnering Conchita Martinez Granados.

ITF Circuit finals

Singles: 4 (2–2)

Doubles: 13 (6–7)

References

External links
 
 

1983 births
Living people
Argentine female tennis players
People from San Francisco, Córdoba
Sportspeople from Córdoba, Argentina
South American Games medalists in tennis
South American Games silver medalists for Argentina
Competitors at the 1998 South American Games
21st-century Argentine women